Michelle Torres (born June 27, 1967) is an American retired professional tennis player.
She is also known as Michelle Casati.

Career
At age 15 Torres played Wimbledon, the French and U.S. Opens. By 1984 she was ranked in the top 20 in the world. That year, at 17, she reached her only two finals on the WTA Tour, winning one at the Florida Federal Open over Carling Bassett and losing the other to Martina Navratilova at the Maybelline Classic.

WTA Tour finals

Singles: 2 (1–1)

References

External links
 
 

1967 births
Living people
American female tennis players
Tennis people from Illinois
21st-century American women